The 2023 West Asian Football Federation Championship will be the 10th edition of the WAFF Championship, an international tournament for member nations of the West Asian Football Federation (WAFF).

The tournament was set to take place from 2 to 15 January 2021, but was initially postponed to a later date that year. On 29 July 2021, the WAFF announced that the tournament will take place between 20 March and 2 April 2023 in the United Arab Emirates.

However, on 6 February 2023, the WAFF announced that the UAE had withdrawn from hosting the tournament. On 26 February 2023, the WAFF announced that the tournament would be postponed to a later date.

In addition to 11 teams from the WAFF, Thailand from the ASEAN Football Federation have also been invited as guests.

Teams

Participants 
Initially, all 12 WAFF nations had agreed to participate for the first time in the competition's history. However, Qatar were later replaced by Thailand in January 2023.

Squads 

Each team must register a squad of 23 players, minimum three of whom must be goalkeepers.

See also 
 25th Arabian Gulf Cup
 2022 WAFF Women's Championship
 2022 EAFF E-1 Football Championship
 2023 SAFF Championship
 2022 AFF Championship
 2023 AFC Asian Cup

References

External links
  

 
2023
2023 in Asian football
Association football events postponed due to the COVID-19 pandemic